Terry Alexander (8 June 1944 – 9 June 2013) was an Australian rules footballer who played for Collingwood in the Victorian Football League (VFL) during the late 1960s.

Alexander, who was originally from Thornbury, played as a ruckman at Preston and represented the Victorian Football Association in the 1966 Hobart Carnival. He came to Collingwood in 1967, who were coming off a one-point Grand Final loss the previous season. Coach Bob Rose played Alexander in the forward pocket when he wasn't doing ruck-work. His last game for Collingwood was the Magpies' 1969 preliminary final loss to Richmond.

References

Holmesby, Russell and Main, Jim (2007). The Encyclopedia of AFL Footballers. 7th ed. Melbourne: Bas Publishing.

1944 births
2013 deaths
Collingwood Football Club players
Preston Football Club (VFA) players
Australian rules footballers from Victoria (Australia)